A by-election was held in the federal riding of Saint-Laurent in Quebec, Canada on 3 April 2017 following the resignation of Liberal MP and Minister of Foreign Affairs Stéphane Dion, who was appointed to a diplomatic post. The seat was held by the Liberal candidate Emmanuella Lambropoulos on a reduced majority.

The by-election was scheduled to coincide with four others across the country; Calgary Heritage, Calgary Midnapore, Markham—Thornhill and Ottawa—Vanier.

Background

Constituency 

The district corresponds exactly to the borough of Saint-Laurent in the city of Montreal.

Representation 
The riding (previously called Saint-Laurent—Cartierville) has been represented by Stéphane Dion since 1996, and has been held by the Liberals since its creation in 1988. It has long been regarded as one of the safest Liberal ridings in the nation.

Campaign 
The riding of Saint-Laurent was vacated on February 6, 2017, following the appointment of Liberal MP and former Minister of Foreign Affairs Stéphane Dion as Canada's Ambassador to the European Union and Germany.

The by-election, held on April 3, 2017, was announced on February 22, 2017. The Speaker's warrant regarding the vacancy was received on February 8, 2017; under the Parliament of Canada Act the writ for the by-election had to be issued no earlier than February 19, 2017, and no later than August 7, 2017. The election date must be set to be a Monday at least 36 days after the writ is issued.

Candidates 
Candidates for the Liberal nomination included former Nelligan MNA and provincial cabinet minister Yolande James, and tax law professor Marwah Rizqy, the 2015 Liberal candidate in Hochelaga. Saint-Laurent Borough Mayor and Montreal City Councillor Alan DeSousa intended to run for the nomination but was rejected by the party's nomination committee. In what was seen as a surprising result, both James and Rizqy were defeated for the Liberal nomination by local educator Emmanuella Lambropoulos.

Jimmy Yu, a Conservative Party national councillor, was named the Conservative candidate on March 8. Yu previously ran for the party in the same riding in 2015. Conservative leadership candidate and venture capitalist Rick Peterson had expressed interest in running for the nomination, but declined on March 7.

Mathieu Auclair was named the New Democratic Party's candidate.

William Fayad was named the Bloc Québécois candidate.

Deputy Leader Daniel Green was named the Green Party candidate.

Results

2015 results

References 

2017 elections in Canada
2017 in Quebec
Federal by-elections in Quebec
Politics of Montreal
April 2017 events in Canada